Fuckwit is vulgar slang for a very stupid person. It may also refer to:

Terry Fuckwitt, a character in the British adult comic Viz
Fuckwit, a short film by Daniel Krige
Fuckwit, a character in comic book miniseries Wanted